Bankim, M'Bankim, Bamkin or Kimi is a town and commune of the division Mayo-Banyo in Adamaoua in Cameroon. It is about 95 km from Foumban and 125 km from Banyo  The area's vegetation is of shrub savanna type.

History 
Bankim is said to have been founded in 1395 by the local chief Kimi who founded the Tikar kingdom. Eldridge Mohammadou has given a date of 1760 to 1780 as the foundation date for the chiefdom.

Hazards 
Loaiasis is hyperendemic in this area, but is regarded as a generally mild and painless disease... It is reported that about 17% of the population in this area carry HIV/Aids, however the survey is based on urban surveys in the capital.

Communications 

Bankim is on the main road from Foumban to Banyo. The provincial road (P26) goes  from nearby Nyamboya to Ndu via Sonkolong,  Atta, and Sabongari.
There is a post office, a hotel, some medical facilities and branches of Union Express and Exchange Express. Mobile phone coverage is good.

Notable residents 
 Joseph Chila, a local photographer who has exhibited in the National Portrait Gallery in London has retired here.

See also
Communes of Cameroon

References 

Communes of Cameroon
Populated places in Adamawa Region